In Blue is a 2000 album by The Corrs.

In Blue may also refer to:
In Blue Tour, a tour by The Corrs
In Blue (Klaus Schulze album), 1995
 In Blue (The Static Jacks album), 2013
 In Blue (film), a 2017 Dutch drama film
 In Blue (Akira Kagimoto), a 2009 documentary video